Daegu Arts University is a South Korean private university specializing in training for the fine arts.  Its campus is located a short distance north of Daegu metropolitan city, in Gasan-myeon of Chilgok County, North Gyeongsang province.  About 35 instructors are employed.  The current president is Lee Seong-geun (이성근).

Academics

The university's academic offerings are divided among divisions of Artistic Theory, Design Theory, Music Theory, and Multimedia Photography Theory.

History

The school first opened as Daegu Arts College in 1993.  It became a university in 1996.

See also
List of colleges and universities in South Korea
Education in South Korea

External links 
Official school website, in English

Universities and colleges in North Gyeongsang Province
Chilgok County
1993 establishments in South Korea
Educational institutions established in 1993